Anthony Loke Siew Fook (born 28 April 1977) is a Malaysian politician who has served as the Minister of Transport for the second term in the Pakatan Harapan (PH) administration under Prime Minister Anwar Ibrahim since December 2022 and the first term in the PH administration under former Prime Minister Mahathir Mohamad from May 2018 to the collapse of the PH administration in February 2020, the Member of Parliament (MP) for Seremban since May 2013, Rasah from March 2008 to May 2013 and Member of the Negeri Sembilan State Legislative Assembly (MLA) for Chennah since May 2013, Lobak from March 2004 to May 2013. He is a member of the Democratic Action Party (DAP), a component party of the PH coalition. He has served as the 6th Secretary-General of DAP since March 2022, 2nd Parliamentary Leader of DAP from July 2018 to March 2022 and previously as National Organising Secretary of DAP. He also served as State Chairman of the Pakatan Rakyat (PR) opposition coalition of Negeri Sembilan before PH took over power from the Barisan Nasional (BN) coalition of the state in May 2018.

Early life and education
Loke was born in Seremban, Negeri Sembilan, and educated at St. Paul's Institution and SMK Seri Ampangan. He graduated from Universiti Kebangsaan Malaysia in 2000 with a degree in development science. He obtained his Master of Public Administration from University of Malaya.

Political career
In 1994, Loke joined DAP at the age of 17, the minimum age requirement of a DAP member. In 2004 Loke was elected to the Negeri Sembilan State Legislative Assembly for the seat of Lobak, and retained his seat in the 2008 election, when he also won election to the federal parliament for the constituency of Rasah. In the 2013 election he switched seats at both state and federal levels, contesting and winning Chennah in the legislative assembly and Seremban in the federal parliament.

Loke apologised to Pakatan Harapan Chairman Mahathir Mohamad after over 40 billboards featured the leader have to be covered after directed by Election Commission of Malaysia.

Loke defended both his Parliament (Seremban) and State (Chennah) seats in 2018 election (GE14) by defeating MCA's candidates, Chong Sin Woon (Parliament) and Seet Tee Gee (State) with a majority of 30,694 votes and 1,115 votes respectively.

In the first Pakatan Harapan Cabinet following victory in GE14, Loke was announced as the new Minister of Transport by the Prime Minister. He was among the first of 14 Cabinet ministers. He was sworn in on 21 May at Istana Negara.

On 20 March 2022, on the 17th DAP National Congress, Loke was re-elected into the Central Executive Committee with 1625 votes, the 3rd highest vote, after Gobind Singh and Chow Kon Yeow. He was then appointed as DAP's 6th Secretary-general after Lim Guan Eng had stepped down from the role after 17 years.

Election results

See also
 Rasah (federal constituency)
 Seremban (federal constituency)
 Chennah (state constituency)

External links
 Loke's official blog

References

1977 births
Living people
People from Negeri Sembilan
Malaysian people of Cantonese descent
Malaysian politicians of Chinese descent
Democratic Action Party (Malaysia) politicians
Government ministers of Malaysia
Transport ministers of Malaysia
Members of the Dewan Rakyat
Members of the Negeri Sembilan State Legislative Assembly
Leaders of the Opposition in the Negeri Sembilan State Legislative Assembly
National University of Malaysia alumni
University of Malaya alumni
21st-century Malaysian politicians